Elaine Jackson Stack (died 19 December 2020) was an American Judge from New York. She was a justice of the New York Supreme Court from 2000 till 2008. 

Stack died from COVID-19 in Manhasset, New York, on December 19, 2020,  at the age of 89, during the COVID-19 pandemic in New York (state).

References

1930s births
2020 deaths
New York Supreme Court Justices
Lawyers from New York City
Deaths from the COVID-19 pandemic in New York (state)